Knud Albjerg (16 November 1929 – 28 September 2003) was a Danish sprint canoeist who competed in the early 1950s. At the 1952 Summer Olympics in Helsinki, he was eliminated in heats of the K-1 1000 m event.

References
Knud Albjerg's profile at Sports Reference.com

1929 births
2003 deaths
Canoeists at the 1952 Summer Olympics
Danish male canoeists
Olympic canoeists of Denmark